The Veil of Maya is a 2017 Italian romantic comedy-drama film directed by Elisabetta Rocchetti.

The film premiered at the Ischia Film Festival on 28 June 2017. It also competed at the 2017 Terra di Siena Film Festival and won the Award for Best Director at the 2017 Fano International Film Festival.

Cast

References

External links

2017 films
2010s Italian-language films
2017 comedy-drama films
Italian romantic comedy films
Films directed by Elisabetta Rocchetti
Films set in Grosseto
Films shot in Tuscany
2010s Italian films